Sibiryakov Island or Sibiryakow Island (Ostrov Sibiryakova), also known as Kuz'kin Island (Кузькин остров), is an island of . It is covered with tundra vegetation.

This island is located in the Kara Sea, off the northern end of the estuary of the Yenisei river, at just  from the nearest coast.

The sea surrounding Sibiryakov Island is covered with pack ice in the winter and there are numerous ice floes even in the summer. The strait between Sibiryakov Island and the mainland is known as Vostochnyy Proliv.

This island belongs to the Krasnoyarsk Krai administrative division of the Russian Federation. It is also part of the Great Arctic State Nature Reserve, the largest nature reserve of Russia.

This island is named after Aleksandr Mikhaylovich Sibiryakov, an Imperial Russian gold-mine proprietor.  Sibiryakov financed explorations to Siberia, such as Nordenskiöld's, and also took part in some expeditions of his own.

Adjacent islands
12 km off Sibiryakov Island's northern cape lies a narrow and curved group of three islands known as Nosok Island (Остров Носок; Ostrov Nosok).

References
 Nature Reserve: 
 Encyclopædia Britannica.

See also
Kara Sea

Islands of the Kara Sea
Islands of Krasnoyarsk Krai